Neville Stamp (born 7 July 1981) is an English former professional footballer who played as a defender in the Football League for Reading and York City, and in non-League football for Basingstoke Town.

References

External links

1981 births
Living people
Sportspeople from Reading, Berkshire
English footballers
Association football defenders
Reading F.C. players
York City F.C. players
Basingstoke Town F.C. players
English Football League players
Footballers from Berkshire